Sport Club Santa Cruz, also known as Santa Cruz, are a Brazilian football team from Santa Cruz, Rio Grande do Norte. They competed in the Série C in 2008.

History
Sport Club Santa Cruz were founded on November 30, 2003. They won the Campeonato Potiguar Second Level in 2004, after beating Vila Nova in the final. Santa Cruz competed in the Série C in 2008, when they were eliminated in the first stage. The club withdrew from competing in the 2009 Série D.

Stadium
Santa Cruz play their home games at Iberêzão. The stadium has a maximum capacity of 4,500 people.

Current squad (selected)

(on loan from ABC)

Achievements

 Campeonato Potiguar Second Level:
 Winners (1): 2004
 Taça Cidade de Natal 2011
 Winners (1): 2011
 Copa FNF: 
 Winners (1): 2013
Campeonato Potiguar: 0
Runners-up (1): 2011
Copa RN: 0
Runners-up (2): 2008, 2009
 Torneio Início do Campeonato Potiguar: 0
Runners-up (1): 2005

Season Records

References

External links 
Official site

Association football clubs established in 2003
Football clubs in Rio Grande do Norte
2003 establishments in Brazil